Bahawalnagar District (Urdu and ), is a district of Punjab province in Pakistan. Before the independence of Pakistan, Bahawalnagar was part of Bahawalpur state governed by the Nawab of Bahawalpur. The city of Bahawalnagar is the capital of the district. Its population according to the 2017 census is  people.

District boundaries
The boundaries of Bahawalnagar in the east and south touches the Indian territory of Bikaner and Firozpur districts while Bahawalpur district lies on its west and river Sutlej flows on its northern side. District Bahawalnagar spreads over an area of 8878 square kilometers.

Administration

The district of Bahawalnagar is spread over an area of 8,878 square kilometres comprising five tehsils and 118 Union Councils:

Demographics
At the time of the 2017 census the district had a population of 2,975,656, of which 1,510,427 were males and 1,464,900 females. Rural population is 2,355,970 while the urban population is 619,686. The literacy rate was 53.08%. Muslims made up almost the entire population with 99.58%.
The sub-campus of Islamia University is located here.

Languages
At the time of the 2017 Census of Pakistan, the distribution of the population of Bahawalnagar District by first language was as follows:
 95.1% Punjabi
 2.0% Saraiki
 1.6% Urdu
 0.3% Pashto
 0.0% Hindko
 0.0% Sindhi
 0.0% Balochi
 0.0% Kashmiri
 0.0% Brahui
 0.8% Others

History

Nawab Bahawal Khan-1 as second nawab of Bahawalpur ascended the throne in 1746 A.D.

Muhammad Mubarik after ruling successfully for years died issueless in 1772 A.D. He was succeeded by nephew Sahibzada Jafar Khan alias Nawab Muhammad Bahawal Khan-II in 1772.

Shrine of Tajuddin Chishti
Shaikh Khawaja Tajuddin Chishti also known as Taj Sarwar Chishti was a Sufi saint of Chishti Order. He was a grandson Shaikh Farid-ud-din Ganjshakar of Pakpattan and his descendants founded the village of Chishtian around 1265 CE (574 Hijri, Islamic calendar). Many native tribes in Punjab region accepted Islam due to his missionary Daawah. Shaikh Khawaja Tajuddin Chishti faced hostility from many Mughal and Turk tribes that opposed his Muslim missionary Daawah as it interfered with their plans and he was martyred in a battle and was buried in Chishtian. Shrine of Sufi saint Shaikh Khawaja Tajuddin Chishti, located at the city of Chishtian. The dargah of Shaikh Taj-ud-din Chishti is called Roza Taj Sarwar.

See also
{{columns-list|colwidth=22em|
 Bahawalnagar
 Bahawalnagar Junction railway station
 Islamia University
 Punjab, Pakistan
 India–Pakistan relations
 Bahawalnagar District

References

 
 Districts of Punjab, Pakistan